Pennsylvania Route 618 (PA 618) is a  state highway located in Crawford County, Pennsylvania.  The southern terminus is at US 6 in Sadsbury Township.  The northern terminus is at PA 18 in Summit Township.

Route description

PA 618 begins at an intersection with US 6 in Sadsbury Township, heading north on a two-lane undivided road through woodland. The road continues through more forests with a few homes before reaching the residential community of Conneaut Lake Park, where it curves northeast and crosses into Summit Township. After passing through Conneaut Lake Park, PA 618 runs between the Park Golf Course to the west and a field to the east before ending at PA 18.

Major intersections

See also

References

External links

Pennsylvania Highways: PA 618

618